Scopula divisaria is a moth of the family Geometridae. It is found from the Indian subregion, Sri Lanka to Taiwan and Sulawesi.

Description
Its wingspan is about 40 mm. Both wings with highly crenulate outer margin and produced to points at all the veins except vein 5. It is a greyish moth with slightly fuscous irrorations (sprinkles) and a violaceous tinge. Frons blackish. Vertex of head whitish. Forewings with rufous costa. A bright verditer-greenish sub-basal patch found below cell and spot above it in cell and spot above it in cell. There is a quadrate patch found in end of cell another from below it to inner margin, and one beyond cell, a slightly sinuous dark postmedial line terminating at outer angle in a crimson mark. Two large quadrate green sub-apical patches can be seen. Hindwings with large quadrate green patch in cell, another below cell extending to inner margin and to near anal angle. a trilobate patch found beyond cell. Outer area purplish, with some red beyond the green patches. A sinuous postmedial medial line terminating in a crimson line at anal angle, A crimson subapical line and spot. Both wings with dark marginal line can be seen. Ventral side is pale, mostly with fuscous suffusion.

Larva very long and thin, with more or less cylindrical body. The ventral surface light green, but suffused rusty red dorsally, with several obscure, slightly wavy longitudinal lines. The larvae have been reared on Hymenodictyon.

Subspecies
Scopula divisaria divisaria
Scopula divisaria perturbata (Prout, 1914) (Taiwan)
Scopula divisaria virentiplaga (Prout, 1938) (Sri Lanka)

References

External links
The Moths of Borneo

Moths described in 1861
divisaria
Moths of Asia